Goodbye Bruce Lee: His Last Game of Death, also known as The New Game of Death and Legend of Bruce Lee, is a 1975 Bruceploitation martial arts film starring Bruce Li.

Synopsis
A young man (Bruce Li) unwittingly gets wrapped up in a money scam. He obtains a bag full of money, after which he is attacked by a group of thugs and a tall basketball player. When he refuses to give the cash back to the criminals, they kidnap his girlfriend and hold her hostage in the Tower Of Death. Once there, he is given two options. Watch his girlfriend get thrown off the top or fight various martial artists on 7 different levels to win his girlfriend back.

The opponents in the Tower include: a synchronized pair of fighters, a Japanese swordsman, a karateka, a wrestler, an Indian nunchaku-wielding fighter, and a bare-knuckled boxer who talks a lot but ends up surrendering easily. Finally, on the last level, the protagonist engages in a drawn-out fight with a whip-wielding villain while the remaining henchmen hold his girlfriend over the Tower’s ledge. After the hero wins the last fight, the villains release his girlfriend and surrender to the police.

Release
The film was released in 1975 in Hong Kong, Taiwan, West Germany, and the Netherlands. It was released in 1976 in the United States, France, and Denmark. It was released in Turkey in May 1977.

Reception

Blood Brothers gave the film a 2 out of 5. Thevideovaccum.com gave the film 2.5 stars. Variedcelluloid gave the film 4 out of 5 stars.

References

External links
 
 

1975 films
1975 martial arts films
1970s action thriller films
Bruceploitation films
Taiwanese martial arts films
Kung fu films
Game of Death